The legislative districts of Northern Samar are the representations of the province of Northern Samar in the various national legislatures of the Philippines. The province is currently represented in the lower house of the Congress of the Philippines through its first and second congressional districts.

History 
Northern Samar was represented as part of the first district of Samar until 1967, and of Region VIII from 1978 to 1984. From 1984 to 1986 it elected two assemblymen at-large. In 1986 it was redistricted into two legislative districts.

1st District 
Municipalities: Allen, Biri, Bobon, Capul, Catarman, Lavezares, Lope de Vega, Mondragon, Rosario, San Antonio, San Isidro, San Jose, San Vicente, Victoria
Population (2015): 336,265

Notes

2nd District 
Municipalities: Catubig, Gamay, Laoang, Lapinig, Las Navas, Mapanas, Palapag, Pambujan, San Roque, Silvino Lobos
Population (2015): 296,114

Notes

Lone District (defunct) 

Notes

At-large (defunct) 

Notes

See also 
Legislative districts of Samar

References 

Northern Samar
Politics of Northern Samar